Insane Championship Wrestling (ICW) is a professional wrestling promotion based in Glasgow, Scotland, founded by Mark Dallas in 2006. It mixes elements of traditional sports entertainment with hardcore wrestling; thus admittance is restricted to those over 18 years old.

The company began expanding across the UK, and was featured in a Vice Magazine documentary in 2012 and BBC documentary in 2014. It was named UK Promotion of the Year by Fighting Spirit Magazine in 2012, 2013, 2014 and 2018.

ICW formerly aired on cable television station MyChannel across Europe. ICW records and releases the majority of their shows on limited edition DVD as well as producing series of their own YouTube show, ICW Worldwide. In 2015, ICW launched their On Demand service (ICW On Demand), which has become the company's primary source of distribution of content.

On August 13, 2020, it was announced that ICW content (along with content from EVOLVE, PROGRESS and wXw) would be available on WWE's video on-demand service, WWE Network.

History

2006–2012

Mark Dallas founded the promotion while living with his girlfriend in Glasgow's Red Road Flats in 2006. After attending wrestling training to learn the business from the inside, he ran his first shows at Maryhill Community Centre. Drew Galloway was crowned the company's inaugural Heavyweight Champion on 15 October 2006 after defeating Darkside and Allan Grogan in a three-way match at ICW: Fear & Loathing. Galloway held the title until 22 July 2007 when he was defeated by Darkside. After an almost 2-year hiatus, ICW returned on 9 May 2009 with ICW: Fear & Loathing, however, after another brief hiatus, the company began running shows every other month beginning with ICW: Payback on 28 February 2010.

On 5 June 2010, ICW: Menace 2 Society, a new ICW Heavyweight Champion was crowned for the first time in over three years as BT Gunn won the vacant title in a 4-way match against Wolfgang, Liam Thomson and Johnny Moss. The event also kicked off a tournament for a secondary title, the ICW Zero-G Championship. Another title change occurred on 4 September 2010 at ICW: Dazed and Confused when moments after defeating Red Lightning, BT Gunn was challenged by James Scott who won the match and joined the villainous Gold Label faction.

ICW: Fear & Loathing 3 signaled ICW's first venture into Glasgow City Center with the event taking place at Apollo 23 nightclub on 21 November 2010. The finals of the Zero-G Championship Tournament took place with Noam Dar defeating Andy Wild, Falcon and Rob Cage in a four-way elimination match. The Zero-G Championship was briefly dropped by Dar to Lionheart at ICW: Summerbam on 14 August 2011 before winning the title back at ICW: Fear & Loathing 4 on 23 November.

2012–present
2012 saw the introduction of a new event on 22 January, Square Go!. This event was headlined by an over-the-top-rope battle royal granting the winner a shot at the ICW Heavyweight Championship at a time of their choosing. ICW's next event, ICW: Smells like Teen Spirit, took place in The Garage venue, in Glasgow; the venue would later host many ICW shows. The beginning of the year saw ICW gain TV exposure through MyChannel, although their tenure on the station was short-lived as they were removed from programming after one of their shows was shown at an inappropriate time.

During the summer, the ICW Tag Team Championship was introduced and, after a series of elimination matches, STI (Dickie Divers & William Grange) defeated The Bucky Boys (Davie Boy & Stevie Boy) for the titles at ICW: Hadouken!.

After the airing of an in-house mockumentary and his prominent role in the Vice documentary, Grado became prominent in the promotion of ICW. At the 2nd Annual Square Go!, Mikey Whiplash secured his opportunity at the Heavyweight Championship while ICW ventured out of Glasgow for the first time with a show at Studio 24 in Edinburgh. In Edinburgh at ICW: Tramspotting, qualifying matches would begin for the new ICW Fierce Females Championship. The Tag Team Championship changed hands for the first time with STI losing their titles to The Bucky Boys in a ladder match at ICW: Get To Da Choppa. At ICW: Reservoir Dogs, ICW announced that they were being filmed as the subject of a BBC documentary.

On 7 February 2015, the ICW Heavyweight Championship was renamed the ICW World Heavyweight Championship following title defenses in England, Denmark and the United States by Drew Galloway. On 27 February 2016, ICW had their first show in Ireland named The Big Elbowski, where Big Damo defeated Chris Renfrew for the ICW World Heavyweight Championship.

On 5 November 2017, on a Road to Fear and Loathing X tour show in Cardiff, Triple H and NXT United Kingdom Champion Pete Dunne made a special guest appearance.

On 12 September 2018, the ICW Women's Championship was renamed the ICW Women's World Championship, after then-champion Viper defended the title in a number of countries around the globe.

Events
The promotion currently books most of its events in Glasgow with occasional events in Edinburgh. As the company grows, it has expanded to the rest of the UK, having held events in London and Newcastle with shows in Liverpool, Leeds and Birmingham booked in the future as part of a working relationship with O2 Academy venues. ICW runs shows in Glasgow's The Garage and Studio 24 in Edinburgh as well as ABC Glasgow.

As Fear & Loathing got bigger, ICW went on to host events at SEC Centre, and in 2016 held the biggest event in European wrestling since the Dale Martin Wembley Arena shows of the early 80's in Glasgow's OVO Hydro with a claimed over 6000 attendees. Fear & Loathing would be held at the OVO Hydro in the two years following, featuring the likes of Rey Mysterio, Rob Van Dam, Noam Dar & James Storm.

In July 2018 after a recent fire that caused damage to O2 ABC Glasgow, ICW had to reschedule their 2-day summer event Shugs Hoose Party 5 to Glasgow's O2 Academy for the first time ever.

In February 2019, ICW announced the first ever 'King Of Hawners' tournament, taking place on the 26 & 27 May, with 8 trios teams competing in the inaugural tournament.

ICW On Demand
ICW On Demand is a video-on-demand service owned by Insane Championship Wrestling. All major ICW events are uploaded on the service shortly after taking place.

ICW Fight Club is the company's weekly episodic show, with episodes premiering on ICW On Demand on Friday nights.

The service also features matches from the promotion's archives, dating back to 2012. Retrospectives of pre-2012 events, shoot interviews and documentaries are also available.

Championships and accomplishments

Current championships

Square Go! Briefcase Holders
In a combination of WWE's Royal Rumble and Money in the Bank matches, the competitors compete in a 30-man over-the-top-rope battle royal, the Square Go!, with the winner earning the Square Go Briefcase.  This gives the holder an opportunity to cash-in the briefcase for an ICW World Heavyweight Championship match at any time of their choosing for up to one year. More recently, the contract holder has also had the option of cashing in the contract for a shot at the ICW Zero-G Championship.

Other personnel

Hall of Fame

See also
WWE NXT UK

References

External links 
 

 
Entertainment companies established in 2006
British professional wrestling promotions